"Me and God" is a song written and recorded by American country music artist Josh Turner, recorded as a duet with Ralph Stanley, with backing vocals from Marty Roe, Gene Johnson, and Dana Williams of Diamond Rio.  It was released in November 2006 as the third single from his album Your Man.  The song was nominated for a 2007 Academy of Country Music award for Vocal Event of the Year.

Chart performance
"Me and God" debuted at number 54 on the U.S. Billboard Hot Country Songs chart for the week of November 25, 2006.

References

2006 singles
Josh Turner songs
Song recordings produced by Frank Rogers (record producer)
MCA Nashville Records singles
Songs written by Josh Turner
2006 songs